Two submarines of the Royal Australian Navy (RAN) have been named HMAS Otway.

 HMAS Otway (1927), an Odin-class submarine launched in 1926 and transferred to the Royal Navy in 1931.
 , an Oberon-class submarine launched in 1966, and decommissioned in 1994. The casing and fin are preserved at an inland park in Holbrook, New South Wales.

See also
, an armed merchant cruiser sunk during WWI.

Royal Australian Navy ship names